Osman Nuri Pasha is commonly known as Gazi Osman Pasha.

Osman Nuri Pasha may also refer to:

 Osman Nuri Pasha (painter) (1830s–1906), Ottoman painter and military officer
 Osman Nuri Koptagel (1874–1942), officer of the Ottoman Army and a general of the Turkish Army

See also
Osman Nuri (disambiguation)
Osman Pasha (disambiguation)
 Gaziosmanpaşa (disambiguation)
 Osman (name)